Thomas Tunnock Limited, commonly known as Tunnock's, is a confectionery company based in Uddingston, Scotland. It is headed by  Boyd Tunnock, grandson of Thomas. In 2013, a joint report by Family Business United and Close Brothers Asset Management named it the 20th oldest family firm in Scotland.

As of 2019, Tunnock's has been the sponsor of the Scottish Challenge Cup in Scottish football.

History
Tunnock's was formed by Thomas Tunnock (b. 1865) as Tunnock's in 1890, when he purchased a baker's shop in Lorne Place, Uddingston. The company expanded in the 1950s, and it was at this time that the core products were introduced to the lines, when sugar and fat rationing meant that products with longer shelf-lives than cakes had to be produced.

Since 2005, Tunnock's has sponsored the Tour of Mull, an annual car rally held on the Isle of Mull.

In September 2010, Tunnock's workers in Uddingston, Lanarkshire, conducted two 24-hour strikes during contract negotiations. At main issue were salaries, with management having originally offered an increase of 1%, followed by a second offer of 2%. The dispute was resolved in October 2010 with agreement on a 2.5% increase backdated to the start of July 2010, followed by a 2.5% increase in July 2011.

In an April 2012 interview with The Herald, Boyd Tunnock described himself as a Unionist on the question of Scottish independence.

In the 2014 Commonwealth Games opening ceremony in Glasgow, the teacakes took centre stage as dancers dressed as teacakes danced around the main performers near the start of the show. Sales of Tunnock's tea cakes were 62% higher at Waitrose the day after the ceremony.

In November 2015, Tunnock's made a donation of £250,000 to an appeal for an independent lifeboat station at St Abbs.

In January 2016 Tunnock's faced a boycott campaign from Scots who supported an independent Scotland, due to mistaken allegations that they had removed the Scottish lion and other Scottish branding from their products. The branding of the packaging remains the same, but advertisements found in London promoted it as a British (rather than exclusively Scottish) product.

In July 2017, Tunnock's announced it would be branding their wafer creams sold in Japan, as "Made in Great Britain". Managing Director Boyd Tunnock quoted: "You've got the Great British Bake Off and things like that these days. We could have said Scottish but you're then promoting Scotland. We're British."

Teacakes 

The Tunnock's Teacake is a sweet food often served with a cup of tea or coffee.  It was developed by Sir Boyd Tunnock in 1956. The product consists of a small round shortbread biscuit covered with a dome of Italian meringue, a whipped egg white concoction similar to marshmallow, although somewhat lighter in texture. This is then encased in a thin layer of milk or dark chocolate and wrapped in a red and silver foil paper for the more popular milk chocolate variety, with blue, black, and gold wrapping for the dark.

Retired RAF bomber pilot Tony Cunnane told of how Tunnock's Teacakes became a favourite ration snack of the V bomber nuclear deterrent flight crews based at RAF Gaydon, especially after discovering that they expanded at high altitude. This ended after one was left unwrapped and exploded on the instrument panel.

Caramel wafers 

The Tunnock's Caramel Wafer, officially the Tunnock's Milk Chocolate Coated Caramel Wafer Biscuit, is a bar consisting of five layers of wafer, separated by four layers of caramel. The bar is coated in chocolate, made from cocoa and milk solids. The wafers are wrapped in red and gold coloured foil. Dark chocolate wafers, wrapped blue and gold, are also available.

The University of St Andrews has a Tunnock's Caramel Wafer Appreciation Society, founded in 1982.

In 2022, Tunnock's were the pitch sponsor at Uddingston Rugby Club, turning their padded posts into wrapped Caramel Wafer bars.

Other products 

The other products in Tunnock's lines are largely based on the core products. The Caramel Log is similar to the Caramel Wafer, but with the addition of roasted coconut to the outside of the bar. Wafer Creams and Florida Orange have chocolate and orange flavoured cream in place of the caramel.

A Snowball is similar to the Tea Cake, with the addition of grated coconut to the exterior of a soft chocolate shell but with no biscuit base.

Despite pressure to do so, Tunnock's does not make any own brand biscuits for supermarkets.

In 2013, Tunnocks's entered into an agreement with Tesco to sell a range of branded items produced by Glasgow-based promotional materials firm Orb. Fergus Loudon, sales manager for Tunnock's stated: "As well as teacake tea towels, aprons and china mugs, there will be the ideal gift for the many caramel wafer fans – a ‘yard of caramel wafers’." As of 2015, the products continue to be sold both through Tesco and directly from Orb.

References

External links 

 

Food manufacturers of Scotland
Food and drink companies of Scotland
Food and drink companies established in 1890
Marshmallows
Bakeries of the United Kingdom
Companies based in South Lanarkshire
Companies based in Glasgow
Scottish brands
Biscuit brands
1890 establishments in Scotland
Chocolate-covered foods
Bothwell and Uddingston